The 2nd Parliament of Pakistan was the unicameral legislature of Pakistan formed after the first assembly was dissolved by Ghulam Muhammad. There were 72 members of parliament, including 40 from East Bengal, 21 from West Punjab, 4 from the Northwest Frontier Province, 5 from Sindh, 1 from Balochistan and 1 from Karachi.

East Bengal

 Abdul Aleem
 Abdul Karim
 Muhammad Abdul Khaleque
 Abdul Wahab Khan
 Abdul Rahman Khan
 Abdus Sattar
 Abdul Mansur Ahmad
 Adeluddin Ahmad
 Ataur Rahman Khan
 Moulana Athar Ali
 Gour Chandra Bala
 Canteswar Barman
 Abdul Latif Biswas
 Hamidul Huq Choudhury
 Nurul Huq Choudhury
 Yusuf Ali Chowdhury
 Akshay Kumar Das
 Basanta Kumar Das
 A.H. Deldar Ahmed
 Bhupendra Kumar Datta
 Kamini Kumar Dutta
 Farid Ahmad
 A. K. Fazlul Huq
 Sardar Fazlul Karim
 Fazlur Rahman
 Peter Paul Gomez
 Lutufur Rahman Khan
 Mahfuzul Huq
 Mahmud Ali
 Rasa Raj Mandal
 Misbahuddin Hussain
 Mohammed Ali
 Moslem Ali Molla
 Sheikh Mujibur Rahman
 Muzaffar Ahmed
 Nurur Rahman
 Sailendra Kumar Sen
 Huseyn Shaheed Suhrawardy
 Abdur Rashid Tarkabagish
 Sheikh Zahiruddin

Punjab

 Mian Abdul Bari
 Abdul Hamid Khan
 Abid Hussain Shah
 Amir Azam Khan Karachi
 Amir Mohammad Khan
 Chaudhry Aziz Din
 Muhammad Hussain
 Abdul Hameed Khan
 Mian Mumtaz Muhammad Daultana
 Abdul Ghani Ishiana
 Malik Faiz
 C.E. Gibbon
 Alamdar Hussain Shah
 Mushtaq Ahmed
 Mian Iftikharuddin
 Iskandar Mirza
 Mozaffar Ali Khan
 Iftikhar Hussain Khan Mamdot
 Balakh Sher Mazari
 Mohammad Ali
 Makhad Mohyuddin 
 Ch Jahan Khan Busal
 Feroz Khan Noon

North-West Frontier Province
 Abdul Rashid Khan
 Jaffer Shah
 Jalal-ud-din Jalal Baba
 M.R. Kayani

Sindh
 M.A. Khuhro
 Siroomal Kirpaldas
 Ali Mohammad Rashdi
 Moula Bakhsh Soomro
 Ghulam Ali Khan
 K.S Sardar Khan Khoso

Balochistan
 Khan Sahib

Karachi
 Yusuf A. Haroon

Changes in members of Second Constitutional Assembly

August, 1955
 Mian Abdus Salam
 Ahmad Nawaz Shah
 Mir Bai Khan
 M.A.H. Jahan Zeb
 Jahangir Khan Maddakhel
 Mehrdil Khan Mahsud
 Waris Khan
 M.H. Kizilbash

March, 1956
 I.I. Chundrigarh
 Mozaffar Ali Khan
 Abdur Rashid Khan

October, 1956
 Ramizudin Ahmad
 Syed Amjad Ali
 Akber Hussain Akhund

January, 1958
 Mian Gul Aurangzeb
 Nadir Ali Shah
 Akber Khan Bughti
 Dingomal N. Ramchandan

See also 

 List of members of the 1st National Assembly of Pakistan
 List of members of the 2nd National Assembly of Pakistan
 List of members of the 3rd National Assembly of Pakistan
 List of members of the 4th National Assembly of Pakistan
 List of members of the 5th National Assembly of Pakistan
 List of members of the 6th National Assembly of Pakistan
 List of members of the 7th National Assembly of Pakistan
 List of members of the 8th National Assembly of Pakistan
 List of members of the 9th National Assembly of Pakistan
 List of members of the 10th National Assembly of Pakistan
 List of members of the 11th National Assembly of Pakistan
 List of members of the 12th National Assembly of Pakistan
 List of members of the 13th National Assembly of Pakistan
 List of members of the 14th National Assembly of Pakistan
 List of members of the 15th National Assembly of Pakistan

References

External links
 National Assembly of Pakistan

 
Lists of members of the National Assembly of Pakistan by term